Tateo (written: 健夫 or 建夫) is a masculine Japanese given name. Notable people with the name include:

, Japanese World War II flying ace
, Japanese golfer

Japanese masculine given names